Terris Chester McDuffie (May 22, 1910 – April 29, 1968) was a professional American baseball player. He was listed at 6' 1" (1.85 m), 200 lb. (91 kg).

Born in Mobile, Alabama, McDuffie was a pitcher, best known as a strong-armed hurler who could challenge hitters with his live fastball. His long career spanned from 1930 through 1954. He played for several teams in different leagues across the United States, Canada, and Latin America.

His pitches also included a sinker, slider, curveball, and a deceptive changeup. Total records are unknown now, but McDuffie probably amassed nearly 200 wins along the way in the many baseball circuits in which he played.

McDuffie was a good hitter, fast baserunner, and unrivaled self-promoter. He often got more attention for his handsome looks, flashy dress, gold jewelry, flamboyant behavior, and his personal life than for his ball playing. He was known as a crowd-pleaser for wearing a jacket with the words The Great McDuffie emblazoned on the back in large letters.

Professional career

Negro leagues
McDuffie started his baseball career in 1930 as an outfielder for the Birmingham Black Barons, hitting a .297 batting average with a .353 on-base percentage and leading the Negro leagues with 18 stolen bases. He batted .273 for Birmingham in 1931, but soon switched to the mound and began developing his pitcher skills.

He bounced around between 1932 and 1933, having stints with the Atlantic City Bacharach Giants, Pollock's Cuban Stars, Hilldale Daisies, and Baltimore Black Sox before joining the Pennsylvania Red Caps of New York in 1934. In that season, he pitched an 18-inning, 3–1 victory over the Jacksonville Red Caps, and hurled a no-hitter for the Brooklyn Eagles against the House of David club the next year. He moved to the consolidated Brooklyn-Newark Eagles late in 1936, playing for them through the 1937 midseason.  

McDuffie struggled in 1936 while battling stomach ailments that would haunt him in later years as well. He rebounded in 1937, going 10–4 with a 3.07 ERA, and hurled two victories over Satchel Paige in three matchups. He quickly became a favorite of Effa Manley, who along with his husband Abe Manley was co-owner of the Eagles. She took an active role in the team, serving as manager and scheduler. Sometimes she took too active a role, for instance, when she tried to control the antics of McDuffie inside and outside the ballpark.

Terris the Terrible, as he was dubbed, amassed a 13–2 record for Newark in 1938 while completing his 18 starts. But he was also at the center of a controversy when the Eagles players and staff hinted at a possible sentimental relation between Mrs. Manfrey and McDuffie. While there is no conclusive evidence to support whether or not she and McDuffie had an affair, Abe Manley promptly traded him to the New York Black Yankees.

Overall, his 1938 pitching record of 14–4 was second in the league, one win behind Homestead Grays ace Ray Brown.

After that, McDuffie spent 1939 with the Black Yankees and the Baltimore Elite Giants and made his first appearance in the East-West All-Star Game in a relief role. He ended the year in the California Winter League, the first integrated baseball circuit in the 20th century as players from Major League Baseball and the Negro leagues played each other in training games. McDuffie led the league's pitchers with a 5–3 record, surpassing Johnny Lindell, Bob Feller, Lee Stine, George Darrow, Tom Glover, and Pat Tobin, among others.

Mexico League
For the next decade, McDuffie split his playing time between the Negro leagues and the Mexican League. He opened 1940 with the Philadelphia Stars but jumped to the Gallos de Santa Rosa Mexican team early in the year. Then, the Homestead Grays signed him in 1941. He posted a 27–5 record for the Grays, helping the team win the 1941 Negro National League Pennant, and also was the starter and winning pitcher in the East-West All-Star Game.

McDuffie remained with the Grays until 1942 and then played in Mexico with the Algodoneros de Torreón in the 1943 season. He rejoined the Eagles in 1944 because of his status draft and started the East-West All-Star Game, but did not have a decision in the game. During the 1945 spring, he auditioned for the Brooklyn Dodgers general manager Branch Rickey, who made no offer. McDuffie was 34 years old at the time, and well past his prime.

At one point after World War II, McDuffie was the highest-paid player in the Eastern division of the Negro with a salary of $6,000 a year. He spent part of 1945 with the Eagles before joining the Mexican Tecolotes de Nuevo Laredo late in the season. He later returned to Torreón in 1946 and played for the Aguilas de Veracruz in 1947, during what would be his last season in the Mexican League. Unfortunately, McDuffie suffered serious and debilitating illnesses that affected his performance in the league. In 1945 he missed time due to an appendix operation, while the following year he had a stomach operation to remove an internal growth. He finished with a record of 21–33 during his unfortunate stay in Mexico.

Provincial League
McDuffie later pitched for the St. Jean Braves and Sherbrooke Athletics of the Quebec Provincial League between 1948 and 1951. In his first season, he tied teammate/manager Jean-Pierre Roy for the most wins in the league with nineteen, and later went 7–1 for the 1951 Sherbrooke champion team. In between, he also played in Cuba, Puerto Rico, Venezuela and the Dominican Republic.

Cuba League
Following his path through the Caribbean, McDuffie played in the Cuban League for the Leones de la Habana, Elefantes de Cienfuegos, Alacranes del Almendares, and Tigres de Marianao, in part or all of nine seasons spanning 1937–1953.

While playing for Marianao in 1952–1953 McDuffie had the misfortune to play for manager Dolf Luque, a former major league pitcher who was notorious for his bad temper and conflicts with other people. During a playoff series, Luque wanted McDuffie to start on two days' rest, but McDuffie refused to say his arm was sore. Once the enraged manager returned to the locker room from his adjacent office waving a loaded pistol and pointing it at the pitcher, McDuffie quickly changed his mind, went out and fired a two-hitter game.

His most productive season in Cuba came with Cienfuegos in 1944–1945, when he posted a 7–6 record and a league's second-best 2.35 ERA in twenty games while leading in complete games (9), strikeouts (68), walks (43), and innings pitched (138). He compiled a 37–43 record during his Cuban visits.

Puerto Rico League
McDuffie also spent parts of two seasons in the Puerto Rico League, although he did not enjoy much success in the circuit. He played for the Senadores de San Juan in the 1941–1942 tournament, joining a team that featured Monte Irvin, Luis Olmo and Bill Wright, but it did not prevent the Leones de Ponce from winning the championship. Then an important rule change came in 1944–1945 when the league allowed three imports per team. Since the start, the Cangrejeros de Santurce counted with Roy Campanella and McDuffie, but that did not stop Ponce from winning a fourth straight pennant, frequently led by perennial batting champion Francisco Coimbre.

Venezuela League
In addition, McDuffie played for the Navegantes del Magallanes of the Venezuelan Professional Baseball League during the 1949–1950 and 1950–1951 seasons. He reported late for his first stint with Magallanes, but responded with a 3–0 record and a solid 1.86 ERA in four pitching appearances, including three starts and two complete games, helping the team win the pennant. Magallanes was led by outfielder/manager Vidal López, who topped the league with nine home runs and 43RBIs, while ending second with a .355 batting average, .32 points shy of teammate Jim Pendleton, en route to the 1950 Caribbean Series.

Caribbean Series
The Venezuelan club finished with a 1–5 record in the Series, while McDuffie lost his two starts against Luis Arroyo and the Criollos de Caguas by scores of 2–1 and 3–2, suggesting a bit of bad luck. In his first start McDuffie was blanking the Puerto Rico team 1–0 on three hits through eight-plus innings, but gave up a two-out, pinch-hit two-run homer to Wilmer Fields in the bottom of the ninth, and Caguas won the contest 2–1. He lasted seven innings in his second start, giving up three runs on six hits, while Magallanes batted just six singles and left seven runners on base. McDuffie posted a 0–2 record and a 2.87 ERA in 15⅔ innings of work, while limiting the opposing batters to a .200 average, and did not return to the Series.

He declined in his second season with Magallanes, going 1–3 with a 6.86 ERA in seven games (three starts).

Dominican Republic League
Besides, McDuffie pitched in the Dominican Professional Baseball League in 1952. He posted a 14–3 record in the regular season and went 2–0 with a save in the playoffs, as the Aguilas Cibaeñas defeated the Tigres del Licey in the maximum of seven games to claim the championship title. McDuffie won the MVP award for his contribution in three of the four victories of his team. He has culturally referenced as the creator of the popular catchphrase La hit no gana juego (Hits do not win games), a reference to the many hits he allowed, but still ended up winning the games.

Texas League
At age 44, he had the last run in the Texas League with the Dallas Steers club in 1954, posting a 3–4 record and a 3.04 ERA in 14 games (nine starts). A leg injury during the season ended his playing days. He combined a career record of 88–53 record between the minors and Negro league baseball.

After baseball
In 1968, McDuffie died in New York City at the age of 57. In 2007, he received the honor of induction into the Cuban Baseball Hall of Fame based in Miami, as part of their Phase IV.

References

External links
 and Baseball-Reference Black Baseball and Minor league stats and Seamheads
Venezuelan Professional Baseball League statistics

1910 births
1968 deaths
Águilas Cibaeñas players
American expatriate baseball players in the Dominican Republic
Algodoneros de Torreón players
Almendares (baseball) players
American expatriate baseball players in Cuba
American expatriate baseball players in Mexico
Baltimore Black Sox players
Baltimore Elite Giants players
Bacharach Giants players
Baseball players from Alabama
Birmingham Black Barons players
Brooklyn Eagles players
Cienfuegos players
Dallas Eagles players
Gallos de Santa Rosa players
Habana players
Hilldale Club players
Homestead Grays players
Marianao players
Mexican League baseball pitchers
Navegantes del Magallanes players
American expatriate baseball players in Venezuela
New York Black Yankees players
Newark Eagles players
Pennsylvania Red Caps of New York players
Philadelphia Stars players
Pollock's Cuban Stars players
Rojos del Águila de Veracruz players
Senadores de San Juan players
Sherbrooke Athletics players
Sportspeople from Mobile, Alabama
St. Jean Braves players
Tecolotes de Nuevo Laredo players